Common names: (none).

Macrovipera lebetinus transmediterranea is a viper subspecies endemic to North Africa. Like all other vipers, it is venomous.

Description
This subspecies is not known to exceed  in total length (body + tail). It is further distinguished by having only 25 midbody dorsal scale rows, a lower ventral scale count of 150-164 scales, and more fragmented head scales. The color pattern is light gray with 34-41 dark transverse bars which are each 2-3 scales wide.

Geographic range
It is found only in North Africa, where it is restricted to the coastal mountains of Algeria and Tunis. One of the few specific localities where it is known to occur is Djebel Murdjaro near Oran in western Algeria. This subspecies may be sympatric with M. deserti and/or D. mauritanica.

References

Further reading
 Nilson G, Andrén C. 1988. Vipera lebetina transmediterranea, a new subspecies of viper from North Africa, with remarks on the taxonomy of Vipera lebetina and Vipera mauritanica (Reptilia: Viperidae). Bonn zool. Beitr. 39 (4): 371-379.

External links
 

Viperinae